is a small promontory on the Sea of Japan coast facing towards the islands of Rishiri and Rebun in Wakkanai, Hokkaidō, Japan. On the south side of the cape is Bakkai Port, where each winter spotted seals that float in on drift ice take shelter. A short distance inland, on the other side of Prefectural Road 106 (ja), is the Bakkai Rock Shelter Site.

See also
 Bakkai Station
 Cape Sōya
 Cape Noshappu
 Rishiri-Rebun-Sarobetsu National Park

References

Wakkanai, Hokkaido
Landforms of Hokkaido
Bakkai